Acrocyrtidus is a genus of beetles in the family Cerambycidae.

Species 
The following species are accepted within Acrocyrtidus:

Acrocyrtidus argenteofasciatus (Pic, 1903)
Acrocyrtidus argenteus Gressitt & Rondon, 1970
Acrocyrtidus attenuatus (Pic, 1927) 
Acrocyrtidus aurescens Gressitt & Rondon, 1970 
Acrocyrtidus auricomus Holzschuh, 1982 
Acrocyrtidus avarus Holzschuh, 1989 
Acrocyrtidus bentanachsi Viktora & Liu, 2018 
Acrocyrtidus diversinotatus (Pic, 1903) 
Acrocyrtidus elegantulus (Matsushita, 1933) 
Acrocyrtidus elegantulus longicornis Hayashi, 1962 
Acrocyrtidus fasciatus Jordan, 1894 
Acrocyrtidus fulvus Gressitt & Rondon, 1970 
Acrocyrtidus griseofasciatus Hayashi, 1982 
Acrocyrtidus jianfeng Viktora & Liu, 2018 
Acrocyrtidus jirouxi Viktora & Liu, 2018 
Acrocyrtidus longipes (Matsushita, 1941) 
Acrocyrtidus simianshanensis Chiang & Chen, 1994 
Acrocyrtidus simianshanensis reductus Holzschuh, 2010

References

Cerambycinae
Beetles described in 1894